Lightless Walk is the debut studio album by American metalcore band Cult Leader. The album was released on October 16, 2015 through Deathwish Inc. and produced by Kurt Ballou of Converge. The track "Gutter Gods" previously appeared on Cult Leader's 2015 EP Useless Animal.

The album's sound was heavily inspired by Cult Leader's cover of "You Are Not My Blood" found on Useless Animal, originally by the indie/folk collaboration between Mark Kozelek and Desertshore from their eponymous 2013 album, Mark Kozelek & Desertshore. Vocalist Anthony Lucero sees himself as being "in the same vocal range" as musicians such as Tom Waits, Nick Cave and Michael Gira, and the fruitful sessions that resulted in "You Are Not My Blood" encouraged Cult Leader to incorporate more of these styling into their metallic punk sound. Lucero said Lightless Walk saw Cult Leader exploring how to write songs that incorporated these two textural elements to balance each other out. He elaborated: "There has to be some sort of silver lining existing somewhere in the world to counterbalance depression. And I tend to write about that a lot." Lyrically, Lightless Walk explores ideas of depression, isolation, sadness and hope.

Track listing

Personnel 
Lightless Walk personnel adapted from CD liner notes.

Cult Leader 
 Michael Mason
 Anthony Lucero
 Casey Hansen
 Sam Richards

Production
 Kurt Ballou – engineering, mixing
 Brad Boatright – mastering

Artwork and packaging
 Anthony Lucero – artwork
 Jacob Bannon – layout

References

External links
Lightless Walk on Bandcamp

2015 albums
Deathwish Inc. albums
Cult Leader albums
Albums produced by Kurt Ballou